The Sanjay Education Society's College of Engineering and Polytechnic was founded in 1983.  The college is affiliated to the North Maharashtra University, Jalgaon, India, under purview of the AICTE. The surrounding area is mostly arid with some farmland.

Courses
The college offers five majors:
 Electronics and Telecommunications Engineering, 
 Production Engineering,
 Mechanical Engineering,
 Civil Engineering,
 Computer Engineering. 

Each department accepts 60 students per branch per academic year. The Civil Engineering Department increased its intake to 60 from the 2010-11 session. Also the intake in Electronics & Telecommunication Engineering has been increased to 120 from 2010-11 session

Besides the Engineering College located at Navalnagar, the institute has a Diploma college located at Wadibhokar in Dhule city.

Extracurricular activities

Annual activities 
The week-long activities held on the college's annual day are collectively called Radiance.  Radiance includes sports competitions amongst students and teachers, which include table tennis, carrom, football, cricket, Kabaddi, and volleyball. Group activities like debates, quizzes, and song and dance competitions are also held. The end of the event is marked by a Cultural Nite, offering Indian and Western stage arts, including traditional and western dance and drama forms.

These activities are planned, organized and executed by the student body, with very little, or no, logistical or financial support from the administration.

SES College won the 1st prize in the inter-college cultural programme in Dhule - "Spandhan" for four consecutive years, between years 1996 and 2000.

Chairman and Founder
The college was founded by Vijay Naval Patil (ex-Cabinet Minister for Telecommunications and Transport, Union of India), (ex-Member of Parliament, Union of India), in 1983.

Chairman
Aniket vijay Patil

Faculty
 Principal - Prof. Dr. S. M. Chaudhari
 Vice Principal - Prof Dr. S. K. Mittal
 Registrar - Prof. P.R. Gawande
 Head Of the Department of Electronics and Telecommunications Engineering) - Prof. V. S. Chaudhari
 Head Of the Department of Production/Mechanical Engineering) - Prof. S.D. Nikam
 Head Of the Department of Civil Engineering - Prof. V. C. Patil
 Head Of the Department of Computer Science & Engineering - Prof. Wagh

Affiliations
The college is affiliated to the North Maharashtra University (NMU), Jalgaon, which operates the Engineering faculty according to guidelines set by the All India Council for Technical Education (AICTE), India.

Alumni
There are no alumni bodies existing in the institute. The students have formed communities on Orkut. which can be found at https://web.archive.org/web/20100108202310/http://www.orkut.com/Main#Community.aspx?cmm=13830272 and https://web.archive.org/web/20100108202310/http://www.orkut.com/Main#Community.aspx?cmm=13219255.

Student chapter affiliations
IEEE, IETE and ISTE.

Transport

Railway stations
Dhule - 
Amalner -

Bus
Amalner bus station - 
Dhule bus station -  
Connectivity to the nearest town, Dhule, is provided by Maharashtra State Transport, ST Buses, and by local private transport in the form of six-seater three-wheelers.

Road
The college campus is located off the road that connects Dhule and Amalner.

Contact
 Administrative wing +91-265260245
 Men's Hostel +91-265260248

External links
 
 http://sanjayeducationsociety.org/

Engineering colleges in Maharashtra
Dhule
Educational institutions established in 1983
1983 establishments in Maharashtra